Sibon dimidiatus is a species of snake in the family Colubridae. It is found in Central America.

References 

Colubrids
Snakes of Central America
Reptiles of Belize
Reptiles of Costa Rica
Reptiles of El Salvador
Reptiles of Guatemala
Reptiles of Honduras
Reptiles of Nicaragua
Reptiles described in 1872
Taxa named by Albert Günther